"Inside" is a song from American singer Monica's second studio album, The Boy Is Mine. It was released only in Europe as the album's fourth single in April 1999. The video, directed by Earle Sebastian (known for his work for Madonna, Mary J. Blige, Destiny's Child, among others) only received airplay in Europe as promotion for the album.

Background and release
"Inside" was the fourth release overall from The Boy Is Mine and the only official release in Europe. The CD version of the single features various remixes produced by Masters at work. The song became Monica's first official single not reaching the charts in the United Kingdom.

Format and track listings
These are the formats and track listings of major single-releases of "Inside."
European CD single
 "Inside" (Album Version) - 4:11
 "Inside" (Masters At Work Radio Edit) - 4:15

European CD maxi single

UK CD single (Part One)
 "Inside" (Album Version) - 4:11
 "Inside" (Masters At Work Remix) (Radio Edit) - 4:15
 "Inside" (Masters At Work Remix) - 8:17

UK and French CD single ("Masters At Work Remixes")
 "Inside" (Masters At Work Remix) (Radio Edit) - 3:53
 "Inside" (Masters At Work Dub) - 8:16
 "Inside" (Masters At Work Dub Intro Vocal Mix) - 7:09

European 12-inch vinyl ("Masters At Work Remixes")
 "Inside" (Masters At Work Remix) - 8:16
 "Inside" (Masters At Work Vocal Dub) - 3:55
 "Inside" (Masters At Work Dub) - 8:16
 "Inside" (Album Version) - 4:11

References

1990s ballads
1998 songs
1999 singles
Arista Records singles
Contemporary R&B ballads
Monica (singer) songs
Song recordings produced by David Foster
Songs written by Diane Warren